Beardowear is a company in Toronto, Ontario, Canada that designs headwear, beard hats, tees, and other accessories. In 2011, Beardowear was featured as a main presenter on Canada's "Dragons' Den" television series on CBC.

Their initial design was the 'beardo beard hat', with a foldaway, detachable and adjustable beard. Beardowear holds several patents for this beardhat design as well as other original products in Canada, USA, the UK and European Union.  Beardo Beard hats and their other products are currently sold through their online store and are also available through several retailers, specialty outlets and other online stores. In June 2011, Beardowear was featured in The Globe and Mail newspaper which lists the company as one of the top twelve quintessentially Canadian small businesses.

Company history

Jeff Phillips founded Beardowear and designed the first beard hat while snowboarding atop the "7th heaven" run in Whistler, British Columbia, Canada in the winter of 2006.  Beardowear has now expanded to a full snow, skate, surf accessories company, sold worldwide and becoming a key leader in beanies sales.
the Beardowear brand expanded to include international hubs in the UK [beardo.co.uk] Australia [beardo.com.au], Russia and the Netherlands.

Celebrities and press

Beardowear has received various press hits from celebrities including; Marilyn Denis, George Stromboulopoulos and Yumi Stynes. The Toronto Star featured the Companies namesake product on the front page of their national paper in 2010
.

References

External links 

Hat companies